Becks Grove is an unincorporated community in Van Buren Township, Brown County, in the U.S. state of Indiana.

History
Becks Grove had a post office between 1868 and 1895. It was named for the Beck family of early settlers.

Geography

References

Unincorporated communities in Brown County, Indiana
Unincorporated communities in Indiana